The 1991 Southwest Conference women's basketball tournament was held March 6–9, 1991, at Moody Coliseum in Dallas, Texas. 

Number 1 seed  defeated 3 seed  60-51 to win their 1st championship and receive the conference's automatic bid to the 1991 NCAA tournament.

Format and seeding 
The tournament consisted of an 8 team single-elimination tournament.

Tournament

References 

Southwest Conference women's Basketball Tournament
1991 in American women's basketball
1991 in sports in Texas
Basketball in Dallas